High School Musical: el desafío is a spin-off film to the High School Musical franchise. It is one of three feature film adaptations of a script written by Pablo Lago and Susana Cardozo and based on the book Battle of the Bands. The film stars the finalists of the Argentine reality television High School Musical: La Selección competition series, and features Andrea del Boca, Adriana Salonia, Peter McFarlane, and Liz Solari.

Principal photography commenced in February 2008, and is notable for being the first Disney-branded feature film made in Latin America. The film was developed for theatrical release, in the Argentina market. Eight new songs have been produced exclusively for the film. In addition to these songs, Alejandro Lerner also composed the main theme, which he performed.

High School Musical: el desafío released in Argentine theaters on July 17, 2008, reaching in its debut week second place in the national box-office charts.

Plot 
A new school year begins at the High School Argentina (HSA), and the students return from the summer vacations. Fer, the captain of the school rugby team, the Jaguars, discovers that Agus, his neighbour and classmate, has changed a lot over the summer. Delfi, however, continues being vain and wastes her time dominating her poor brother, Walter, and her associates Alicia, Clara and Valeria, or, as she prefers to call them, "The Invisibles".

The principal of the school and Ms. D'Arts, the art teacher, invite the students to take part in the school's first battle of the bands, where the kids will have a chance to be showcased as true music stars. Anne-Claire, a former student and now a famous singer, comes to the school as adviser to the contest. Delfi envies her greatly.

Working against the clock and with limited resources, the kids put all the forces for the big day. Fer and Agus, together with Juanchi, Sofi, Facha, Gaston and Walter participate in the contest, forming a band called the Scrum. At the same time, Delfi participates with her friends, and she tries the impossible task of separating Walter from his new friends. But only one band will be the winner, the one which can understand that teamwork, personal development, and study will make them better artists and also better people.

Characters

Main
Fer (Fernando Dente) is the male protagonist of the film. He is the most popular male student at High School Argentina, and the captain of the varsity rugby team, the Jaguars. He faces a new challenge this year in the school: forming a band for the Battle of the Bands, where he will show, despite of the difficulties, his true leadership. He is the equivalent of Troy Bolton.
 Agus (Agustina Vera) is the female protagonist of the film. She is the shy and studious student who, under the astonished eyes of all her peers, suddenly becomes an attractive young girl with a talent for singing. When she feels insecure, Anne-Claire encourages her to be herself and exhibit her artistic talents without fears. She is the equivalent of Gabriella Montez.
 Delfi (Delfina Peña) is the antagonist of the film. She is the typical "rich girl", vain, selfish, who does not spare a second for the others, even for her brother Walter, except to get what she wants: to be the absolute and undisputed star of the school. But at the end, she learns a valuable lesson and redeems herself. She is the equivalent of Sharpay Evans.
 Walter (Walter Bruno) is Delfi's brother, who must use all his ingenuity to evade the surveillance of his sister to be the coach of Fer's band, the Scrum. With Agus's help, and with his perseverance and recklessness, Walter manages to become independent and show his true artistic abilities. He is the equivalent of Ryan Evans.

Other students
 Gastón (Gastón Vietto) is Fer's best friend, who has a deep platonic love with Anne-Claire. There is nothing in the world he wouldn't do for her. He is the equivalent of Chad Danforth, along with Juanchi.
 Juanchi (Juan Macedonio). When there is a funny comment or sudden laughter, that is Juanchi, the guy who never loses his sense of humor. He is also a good drummer. He is the equivalent of Chad Danforth, along with Gastón.
 Facha (Augusto Buccafusco). He does what he can with his guitar ... literally because the instrument has the unfortunate habit of falling down! Anne-Claire is the one who finally pulls out of the muck at the crucial moment in his performance. He is the equivalent of Jason Cross.
 Sofi (Sofía Agüero Petros) is the talented composer of the band. She also demonstrates her positive attitude when time is their principal enemy. She is the equivalent of Kelsi Nielsen.
 Vale (Valeria Baroni) is a great singer, but because she joins Delfi's musical group, she is always overshadowed by the "star". She is the equivalent of Taylor McKessie, along with Anne-Claire.
 Clarita and Alicia (María Clara Alonso and Sophie Oliver Sánchez) are Delfi's unconditional allies and members of her band. The two girls are completely subordinated to the whims and arrogance of the "star". (The equivalent of the Sharpettes.)

Supporting
 Ms. D'Arts (Andrea del Boca) is HSA's art teacher, who, together with the principal, convenes the Battle of the Bands. She is the equivalent of Ms. Darbus.
 The High School Principal (Peter McFarlane)
 Anne-Claire (Liz Solari) is the adviser of the contest, is a former HSA student and now a famous singer and pianist. She is the equivalent of Taylor McKessie, along with Vale.
 Agus' Mum (Adriana Salonia)
 Fer's Dad (Mauricio Dayub) rugby coach of the team, pushes them hard. He is the equivalent of Jack Bolton.
 Donato (Daniel Martins)
 Marta (Carolina Ibarra)

Premiere
The special premiere took place on July 14, 2008 at the Gran Rex Theater. Following the film, the cast and the director, Jorge Nisco, went to the Alvear Hotel for a photo session and a press conference.

The film debuted in cinemas throughout Argentina on July 17, 2008.

Soundtrack

Before the release of the film, the film's soundtrack CD was released, featuring eight new songs produced by Fernando López Rossi. The album has a bonus track with the song "Now Is Time to Shine" (originally in Spanish, "Ya es tiempo de brillar") written by Alejandro Lerner especially for the film, and includes the music video of the song "Summer Has Ended" ("El Verano Terminó").

List of songs

Other international versions

Following this production in Argentina, the film was also remade for Mexico and in Brazil:

In Mexico, as in Argentina, the winners were chosen by a contest (HSM: La Selección), from which Cristobal Orellana and Mariana Magaña emerged to play the leads. The antagonists were not cast from the contest; they were played by Cesar Fernando Soberanes and Mar Contreras. This version generally used the same dialogue (although the wording varied to reflect the Mexican version of Spanish) and songs as the Argentine version, although the songs were adapted with a reggaeton and hip hop style to appeal to the Mexican public. Ironically, the Mexican version was also filmed in Argentina. The Mexican version premiered on September 4, 2008.

In Brazil, the finalists were chosen on HSM - A Seleção. From there emerged Renata Pinto Gomes Ferreira and Olavo Setembro Cavalheiro as the leads, along with Paula Pereia Barbosa and Fellipe Ferreira Guadanucci as the antagonists. The Brazilian version premiered in February 2010.

References

External links
 Official Page of the film 
 Official page of the TV show High School Musical, La Selección 

2008 films
High School Musical films
2000s Spanish-language films
Walt Disney Pictures films
2000s Argentine films